The Boulsa Department is a department or commune of Namentenga Province in northern Burkina Faso. Its capital is the town of Boulsa.

Towns and villages
 Boulsa (capital)

References

Departments of Burkina Faso
Namentenga Province